The Phoenixville Area School District (PASD) is a public school district headquartered in Phoenixville, Pennsylvania.  The current superintendent (2016) is Dr. Alan D. Fegley. The current assistant superintendent (2017) is Dr. Le Roy WhiteHead.

Located in Chester County, PASD serves Phoenixville, East Pikeland Township and Schuylkill Township. The district contains six schools: Phoenixville Area Early Learning Center, Barkley Elementary, Manavon Elementary, Schuylkill Elementary, Phoenixville Area Middle School, and Phoenixville Area High School.

References

External links

 Phoenixville Area School District

School districts in Chester County, Pennsylvania